Justice Dickey may refer to:

Betty Dickey (born 1940), associate justice of the Arkansas Supreme Court
Jay Dickey (1939–2017), special justice for a case before the Arkansas Supreme Court
Theophilus Lyle Dickey (1811–1885), associate justice of the Illinois Supreme Court

See also
Justice Dickie, character in the 2014 Irish film Mrs. Brown's Boys D'Movie